Chinese Coffee is a 2000 independent film drama, starring Al Pacino and Jerry Orbach. The film was directed by Pacino and written by Ira Lewis, adapted from his play of the same name.  Two longtime friends in New York City struggle with their relationship which has become contentious after years of mistrust and resentment over professional and personal failures.

It premiered at the 2000 Telluride Film Festival, and also screened at the 2000 Tribeca Film Festival, where it was introduced by Robert De Niro.

Plot
Harry Levine (Pacino) is a struggling writer barely eking out a living as a doorman—that is, until he is fired. Desperate for money, he pays a visit to his friend Jake Manheim (Orbach), an arts photographer, to collect an old debt. After Jake says he does not have the money, the two engage in an all-night conversation about their respective art, past and present loves, and the directions their lives are heading. The play and film are set in Greenwich Village circa 1982.

Production
Al Pacino directed the 2000 film adaptation of Chinese Coffee, in which he also starred opposite Jerry Orbach. Ira Lewis, who wrote the original play, also penned the screenplay for the film.

The film adaptation was released in New York as part of the Tribeca Film Festival. Shot almost exclusively as a one-to-one conversation between the two main characters, it chronicles friendship, love, loss, and humor of daily life. After years of withholding it, Pacino allowed it to be released on DVD, June 19, 2007 as a part of a three-movie boxed set called Pacino: An Actor's Vision.

Howard Shore reportedly originally composed the score to the film, before Elmer Bernstein was hired to replace him.

Genesis

The screenplay is an adaptation of a two character, one-act play of the same name written by Lewis. Unlike the film, all of the action takes place in Manheim's small Greenwich Village apartment. The film was produced and released thirteen years after Chinese Coffee's initial stage debut.  The first fully staged production was an Off-Broadway closed-ended run in August 1987, at the Apple Corps Theatre in New York City.  It was produced by Robert Barash, directed by David Margulies, starred Al Pacino as Harry Levine, and Marvin Silbersher as Jacob Manheim.

The play later premiered at the Circle in the Square Theatre on Broadway in 1992, directed by Arvin Brown, with Pacino reprising his role as Harry Levine, and Charles Cioffi now cast as Jacob Manheim.

Film title

"Chinese Coffee" refers to a scene in which Levine explains to Manheim why he thinks a cup of coffee in Chinatown restaurants is superior to any other because they use the best beans, brewed fresh in Silex glass pots only, and they give you real cream.  Chinese Coffee is also a metaphor for the safety that Levine feels when he is in one of these restaurants.

References

External links
 Review of Chinese Coffee at Blogcritics
 
 

2000 films
2000 independent films
American independent films
Films about writers
American films based on plays
Films directed by Al Pacino
Films scored by Elmer Bernstein
Films set in New York City
Films set in 1982
Films shot in New York City
2000s English-language films
2000s American films